In Portuguese, Zé Manel or Ze'Manel is a common short form of the name José Manuel, and can refer to:

José Manuel Durão Barroso, the former President of the European Commission
José Manuel da Silva Fernandes, a football player
Zé Manel, a singer and instrumentalist from Guinea-Bissau
José Manuel Cerqueira Afonso dos Santos, a folk musician and political icon, also known as Zeca Afonso or only Zeca